Sanjeev Kumar started his acting career as a stage actor, starting with IPTA in Bombay. He later joined the Indian National Theatre. Even as a stage actor, he had a penchant for playing older roles; at age 22, he played an old man in an adaptation of Arthur Miller's All My Sons. In the following year, in the play Damru directed by AK Hangal, he again played the role of a 60-year-old with six children.

He made his film debut with a small role in Hum Hindustani in 1960. His first film as a protagonist was in Nishan (1965). In 1968, he acted alongside the famous actor of that time, Dilip Kumar, in Sangharsh. He also starred opposite Shammi Kapoor and Sadhana in the superhit film Sachaai (1969).

Movies such as Arjun Pandit, Sholay and Trishul, along with the remakes of Tamil films into Hindi such as Khilona, Yehi Hai Zindagi, Naya Din Nai Raat, Devata, Itni Si Baat and Ram Tere Kitne Naam exemplify his talents. He also did suspense-thriller films such as Qatl, Shikar, Uljhan and Trishna. Kumar also proved his ability to do comedy in films such as Manchali, Pati Patni Aur Woh, Angoor, Biwi-O-Biwi and Hero. He is well remembered for his versatility and genuine portrayal of his characters.
His double role in the film Angoor was listed among the 25 best acting performances of Indian cinema by Forbes India on the occasion of celebrating 100 years of Indian Cinema.

Filmography

Awards

Film Awards

References

External links 

http://www.citwf.com/person253113.htm
http://www.panchamonline.com/

Indian filmographies
Male actor filmographies